Koanophyllon solidaginifolium, the shrubby umbrella thoroughwort, is a plant species native to Arizona, western  Texas, New Mexico, Chihuahua, Coahuila, Durango, Jalisco, and Zacatecas. It grows primarily on canyon walls, ledges, and other stony outcrops.

Koanophyllon solidaginifolium is an herb or subshrub up to 100 cm (39 inches) in height. Leaves are lanceolate with rounded bases and narrow pointed tips. Flowers are usually white, but sometimes tinged with purple or yellow.

References

solidaginifolium
Flora of the Southwestern United States
Flora of Mexico
Plants described in 1852